Darrell Blair-Edward Martinie  The Cosmic Muffin (April 10, 1943 – July 26, 2006) was a Boston-based  professional astrologer and radio personality.

Early life
Martinie was born on April 10, 1943 in Massachusetts and grew up in Illinois.

In 1965, Martinie graduated from the University of Illinois with a degree in political science. In 1966 he began his first job as district manager of Illinois Bell Telephone Company in Decatur, Illinois. In 1971 he graduated from University of Illinois with a degree in psychology. While earning this degree, Martinie was first introduced to astrology when he attended a meeting of the school's astrology club. Although he initially believed astrology to be "stupid" and asinine", he later became hooked. That same year he moved to Boston, as he believed it was the most astrologically perfect place for him. After arriving in the city he began performing horoscope readings to employees of the state welfare department in exchange for them keeping him on the welfare rolls.

In 1972 he entered a Benedictine monastery with the intention of becoming a monk, but left after only nine months. He remained a practicing Catholic throughout his life.

Radio career
In 1973, Martinie telephoned into Charles Laquidara's show on WBCN to correct his mistaken astrological reading. Laquidara would then give Martinie his start in radio as well as his nickname "The Cosmic Muffin", which was taken from a National Lampoon Radio Dinner parody "Deteriorata". His reports were syndicated to stations nationwide. Martinie would end each broadcast with the phrase "It is a wise person who rules the stars, a fool who is ruled by them - Over and out."

In 1993 Martinie was named "Official Astrologer of the Commonwealth of Massachusetts" by Governor of Massachusetts Bill Weld.

In the late 1990s, Martinie began easing into retirement.

Illness and death
On April 10, 2003, Martinie was diagnosed with cancer. He died on July 26, 2006 at his home in Saugus, Massachusetts.

His words "over and out" were the last to be heard on WBCN on August 12, 2009 when the station went off the air.

Personal life
His father was a Catholic and a psychiatrist and his mother was Jewish and a psychologist. He was the oldest of five children.

In 1969 his first marriage ended in divorce. The union produced one son.

Martinie was in a relationship with Edward Boesel from January 7, 1973 until Martinie's death. When same-sex marriage became legal in Massachusetts, Martinie and Boesel married. They were the first same-sex couple to obtain a marriage license in Saugus.

References

1943 births
2006 deaths
American radio personalities
American LGBT broadcasters
Massachusetts Republicans
People from Saugus, Massachusetts
University of Illinois alumni
Catholics from Massachusetts
20th-century American LGBT people
21st-century American LGBT people